Dave Gilmour (born November 14, 1950) is a Canadian former professional ice hockey player who played one game in the World Hockey Association with the Calgary Cowboys during the 1975–76 WHA season.

Career 
Gilmour was selected by the Vancouver Canucks in the sixth round (72nd overall) of the 1970 NHL Amateur Draft. He was then assigned to the team's American Hockey League affiliate, the Rochester Americans.

Personal life 
Gilmour is the older brother of former NHL player Doug Gilmour.

Career statistics

References

External links

1950 births
Living people
Baltimore Clippers players
Canadian ice hockey left wingers
Calgary Cowboys players
Charlotte Checkers (SHL) players
Hamilton Red Wings (OHA) players
Ice hockey people from Ontario
London Knights players
Peterborough Petes (ice hockey) players
Rochester Americans players
Sportspeople from Kingston, Ontario
Vancouver Canucks draft picks